Walter George Lock (11 October 1907 in Bristol – 10 March 1980 in Taunton, Somerset) was a cricketer who played one first-class match for Somerset in 1928.

Lock batted at No 9 in the first Somerset innings of the match against Essex at Chelmsford, and did not bat in the second innings of a match that Somerset won convincingly. Cricket websites do not indicate his batting style, and in his one first-class match, he did not bowl.

External links
Walter Lock at www.cricketarchive.com

References

1907 births
1980 deaths
English cricketers
Somerset cricketers